WCVH (90.5 FM) is a radio station broadcasting from Hunterdon Central Regional High School. The station first went on the air in April 1974. The station features country music and specialty programming.  Starting in 2007, the station began airing play-by-play for Hunterdon Central Football and Basketball.

From 3:00 PM to 9:00 PM on school nights, the station is run by student DJs who work in pairs of two or three for 2-hour shifts. The shifts are from 3:00 PM to 5:00 PM, 5:00 PM to 7:00 PM, and 7:00 PM to 9:00 PM. The students are able to learn about radio operations while practicing it themselves.

References

External links
 
 
 

Country radio stations in the United States
CVH
High school radio stations in the United States